Sander Lantinga (born 27 September 1976 in Biddinghuizen) is a Dutch program maker at BNN, and a radio-DJ at radio station 3FM from 2006 till 2015, in August 2015 he is one of the co host of the Coen en Sander Show on Radio 538. Lantinga drew worldwide attention as the streaker during the quarter final tennis match between Maria Sharapova and Elena Dementieva at Wimbledon in July 2006. He did this for the BNN program 'Try Before You Die'.

He was one of the Dutch commentators alongside Cornald Maas for the Eurovision Song Contest 2021, held in Rotterdam, since usual co-commentator Jan Smit was one of the main hosts for that edition. Maas, Lantinga and Smit were all named members of the committee in charge of selecting the Dutch entry to the Eurovision Song Contest 2022.

References

External links

1976 births
Living people
People from Koggenland
Dutch radio personalities